William Russell Tate (born September 7, 1972) is a former American football tight end. He played for the Tampa Bay Buccaneers in 1996, the Kansas City Chiefs in 1998 and for the Chicago Enforcers in 2001.

References

1972 births
Living people
American football tight ends
Oregon Ducks football players
Scottish Claymores players
Sportspeople from San Bernardino County, California
Tampa Bay Buccaneers players
Kansas City Chiefs players
Chicago Enforcers players
People from Fontana, California
Players of American football from California